The 1981 Miami Redskins football team was an American football team that represented Miami University in the Mid-American Conference (MAC) during the 1981 NCAA Division I-A football season. In its fourth season under head coach Tom Reed, the team compiled an 8–2–1 record (6–1–1 against MAC opponents), finished in second place in the MAC, and outscored all opponents by a combined total of 199 to 154.

The team's statistical leaders included John Appold with 929 passing yards, Greg Jones with 1,134 rushing yards, and Don Treadwell with 391 receiving yards.

Schedule

References

Miami
Miami RedHawks football seasons
Miami Redskins football